Shayan Modarres (born May 15, 1984) is an Iranian American, civil rights activist and attorney in Orlando, Florida. He is originally from the Washington, D.C./Maryland metropolitan area. He has assisted in the representation of the family of Trayvon Martin since 2012. He was a Democratic candidate for United States House of Representatives for Florida's 10th Congressional District in the 2014 midterm election.

Early life 

Modarres was born in Silver Spring, Maryland to immigrant parents who moved to the United States from Iran in the 1970s. His father worked as a statistics professor before retiring from American University in 2013.  His mother works in IT/security for one of the nation's largest healthcare providers. Modarres graduated from American University with a degree in pre-law and political science, and later graduated cum laude from Florida A&M University College of Law.

Career 

After graduating from law school, Modarres immediately opened his own law firm in downtown Orlando.  Modarres still actively operates this firm. In 2013, Modarres represented Attorney Benjamin Crump in an appeal to Florida's 5th District Court of Appeals, regarding a hotly contested deposition, during the case of State v. Zimmerman. He also received a $100,000 settlement in 2013 from the Seminole County Sheriff's Office for an excessive force lawsuit in which two deputies tased a black man in Sanford, Florida.  The lawsuits were later terminated once dash-cam video of the incident surfaced. Modarres also co-organized a rally protesting minimum mandatory sentencing, gun violence, and disparate treatment of minorities in Florida's criminal justice system. The rally drew over 2,000 people to downtown Orlando. Mr. Modarres is currently Deputy Director for Counseling in the Office of the Solicitor, United States Department of the Interior, in Washington, D.C.

Political career 

Modarres is a former Democratic candidate for United States House of Representatives for Florida's 10th Congressional District. He was attempting to unseat the incumbent, Republican Daniel Webster, in the 2014 midterm election. Modarres was endorsed by the Orlando Sentinel in the Democratic primary.

References 

1984 births
Living people
American lawyers
American civil rights activists
American politicians of Iranian descent
Florida Democrats